Igor Lobanov (born July 4, 1969) is a Russian Olympic luger and rock musician. He competed in luge from the late 1980s to 1990, representing the Soviet Union. He won the bronze medal in the mixed-team event at the 1990 FIL World Luge Championships in Calgary, Alberta, Canada. He is currently the leader of alternative rock band Slot.

References

External links
 

Living people
Russian male lugers
Soviet male lugers
1969 births
Lugers at the 1992 Winter Olympics
Olympic lugers of the Unified Team
20th-century Russian male opera singers
Russian rock musicians
Nu metal singers
21st-century Russian male singers
21st-century Russian singers